WELR-FM (102.3 FM, "Eagle 102.3") is a radio station broadcasting a country music format. Licensed to Roanoke, Alabama, United States, the station is currently owned by Eagle's Nest, Inc. and features programming from ABC Radio.

Translators

References

External links

ELR-FM
Country radio stations in the United States
Randolph County, Alabama
Radio stations established in 1969
1969 establishments in Alabama